Pterostylis atrans, commonly known as the dark-tip greenhood or blunt-tongue greenhood, is a species of orchid endemic to south-eastern Australia. As with similar greenhoods, plants in flower differ from those that are not flowering. The non-flowering plants have a rosette of leaves flat on the ground, but the plants in flower have a single flower with leaves on the flowering spike. In this species, the flower is green and reddish brown with a protruding sinus and small club-like tips on the ends of the lateral sepals.

Description
Pterostylis atrans is a terrestrial, perennial, deciduous, herb with an underground tuber and when not flowering, a rosette of egg-shaped leaves, each leaf 10–35 mm long and 10–30 mm wide. Flowering plants have a single flower 14–20 mm long and 10–12 mm wide borne on a spike 150–300 mm high with between three and five spreading stem leaves. The flowers are green with a reddish-brown, down curved tip. The dorsal sepal and petals are fused, forming a hood or "galea" over the column and the dorsal sepal has a thread-like tip 6–9 mm long.  The lateral sepals are held closely against the galea, have erect, thread-like tips 15–20 mm long with small club-like tips and a protruding, platform-like sinus between their bases. The labellum is 9–11 mm long, about 3 mm wide, green with a blunt brown tip that is just visible above the sinus. Flowering occurs from November to April.

Taxonomy and naming 
Pterostylis atrans was first formally described in 1994 by David Jones from a specimen collected in the Brindabella Range. The description was published in Muelleria. The specific epithet is "from the Latin word atrans, darkening, in reference to the dark red-brown colouration towards the apex of the galea".

Distribution and habitat
The dark-tip greenhood mostly grows among grasses in high rainfall forests in Victoria, Tasmania and southern New South Wales.

References

atrans
Endemic orchids of Australia
Orchids of New South Wales
Orchids of Tasmania
Orchids of Victoria (Australia)
Plants described in 1994